
Dowling may refer to:

Places

Australia
 Dowling County, land administrative division in New South Wales

Canada
 Dowling, Ontario, a community

Ireland
 Dowling, Kilkenny

United States
 Dowling, Michigan, census-designated place
 Dowling, Ohio, unincorporated community
 Dowling, South Dakota, a ghost town
 Dowling, Texas, unincorporated community
 Dowling Park, Florida, unincorporated community
 Dowling Township, Knox County, Nebraska

Schools in the United States
 Dowling College, New York
 Dowling Catholic High School, Iowa

Other
 Dowling (surname)
 3529 Dowling, an asteroid

See also
 Dowling v. United States (disambiguation)
 Doweling